Noelia Villegas Rico (born 7 January 1996) is a Spanish footballer who plays as a defender for Valencia.

Club career
Villegas started her career at Atlético Madrid C.

References

External links
Profile at La Liga

1996 births
Living people
Women's association football defenders
Spanish women's footballers
Footballers from Cádiz
Atlético Madrid Femenino players
Fundación Albacete players
Madrid CFF players
Deportivo de La Coruña (women) players
Valencia CF Femenino players
Primera División (women) players
RCD Espanyol Femenino players
Primera Federación (women) players